The Lost Okoroshi is a 2019 Nigerian film produced, directed and edited by Abba Makama under the production studio of Osiris Film and Entertainment. The movie links the African traditional belief system with modernity. It clarifies the modern notion that masquerades are bad and should be feared by painting them as super heroes. The international recognised movie stars Seun Ajayi Judith Audu, Tope Tedela, Ifu Ennada, and Chiwetalu Agu.

Plot 
The film revolves around a young security guard, Raymond, who is melancholic because of the extinction of traditional and cultural antiquities of his country. He began to receive message from Okoroshi, a traditional Igbo figure which usually danced in mask. Eventually, he woke up one day in Okoroshi's attire, unable to neither take it off nor speak.  He disappeared into the air and become the superheroes of the city.

Premiere 
It was premiered globally at the Toronto International Film Festival (TIFF) in September 2019, got premiered at Vevey International Funny Films Festival and it is currently on Netflix.

Cast 

 Seun Ajayi
 Judith Audu
 Tope Tedela
 Ifu Ennada
 Chiwetalu Agu
 Crystabel Goddy

References 

2019 films
Nigerian drama films
Igbo-language films
English-language Nigerian films